Sleepless is the second album by Canadian R&B/soul band jacksoul, released in 2000.

The album won the Juno Award for R&B/Soul Recording of the Year at the Juno Awards of 2001.

Track listing
All tracks produced by Jon "Rabbi" Levine, except where noted.

Personnel
Adapted credits from the liner notes of Sleepless.

Vocals
Lead vocals – Haydain Neale
Background vocals – Jully Black, Marcie English, Haydain Neale, Lorraine Scott, Liberty Silver

Instruments
Acoustic guitar – James McCollum
Bass – Colin Barret, J.K., Haydain Neale
Cello – Akiko Kojima
Keyboards – Jon "Rabbi" Levine, Brent Setterington
Piano – Brent Setterington ("Don't Tell Me")
Shaker – Davide DiRenzo
Violins – Sonja Jung, Alex McMaster

Production
Engineering – Brad Haehnel, Tom Heron, Peter Hudson, Ed Kroutner
Engineering assistant – Chris Stringer, Stu Young
Mastering – Herb Powers
Mixing – Brad Haehnel
Mixing assistant – Joel Kazmi, Robert "Taj" Walton ("Baby I Adore You")

Imagery
Art direction and design – Beehive
Hair – Brian and Rhonda (World Salon, Toronto)
Makeup – Jody Daye
Photography – Margaret Malandruccolo
Styling – Alina Karaman

References

2000 albums
Jacksoul albums
Juno Award for R&B/Soul Recording of the Year recordings